West Kutai Regency is a regency (kabupaten) in the Indonesian province of East Kalimantan. It previously covered a much greater area, with a population of 165,091 at the 2010 Census, but in December 2012 the five northernmost districts were split off to form a new Mahakam Ulu Regency; the residual area of 20,384.6 km2 had a population of 140,097 at the 2010 Census, and 165,938 at the 2020 Census; the official estimate as at mid 2021 was 173,982. The town of Sendawar is the administrative capital.

Administrative Districts  
Following the removal of the northern five districts in December 2012 to form the new Mahakam Ulu Regency, the residual West Kutai Regency is divided into sixteen districts (kecamatan), tabulated below with their areas and their 2010 and 2020 Census populations, together with the official estimates as at mid 2021. The table also includes the locations of the district administrative centres, the number of administrative villages (rural desa and urban kelurahan) in each district, and its postal codes.

Notes: (a) except the four villages of Abit, Muara Jawaq, Rembayan and Tondah (which share a postcode of 75774). (b) includes the riverine island of Pulau Kualan.

References

External links